Shane William James O'Connor (born 4 December 1985 from Dublin) is an Irish former professional darts player who played in Professional Darts Corporation events.

Darts career
O'Connor won the 2008 Irish Matchplay which earned him a place in the 2009 PDC World Darts Championship. He later reached the semi finals of the Gleneagle Irish Masters, beating Jacko Barry 4-0 and Tony Eccles 5–0, eventually losing 5-4 to the eventual winner Michael van Gerwen.

O'Connor was drawn against David Fatum in the preliminary round and, despite a good showing, he was beaten 6–4.

World Championship results

PDC
 2008: Last 70 (lost to David Fatum 4-6) (legs)

Personal life
O'Connor was not a full-time professional and makes his living as a scaffolder.

External links
Profile and statistics on Darts Database

Irish darts players
Living people
1985 births
Professional Darts Corporation former tour card holders
People from Tallaght
Sportspeople from South Dublin (county)